Scotti Hill (born Scott Lawrence Mulvehill on May 31, 1964, in Manhasset, New York) is an American musician best known as a guitarist in the New Jersey heavy metal band Skid Row.

Overview 
One of the last glam metal bands to hit the big time before the advent of grunge in the early 1990s, Skid Row had a sound uncharacteristically heavier than their late 80s counterparts.

Hill was also in the band Ozone Monday with singer Shawn McCabe, current Skid Row members guitarist Dave "The Snake" Sabo and bassist Rachel Bolan and former Skid Row drummer Rob Affuso.

References

External links

1964 births
20th-century American guitarists
American heavy metal guitarists
Living people
Guitarists from New York (state)
People from Manhasset, New York
Rhythm guitarists
Skid Row (American band) members